

Wærstan was a medieval Bishop of Sherborne, venerated as a saint in the Roman Catholic and Eastern Orthodox churches.

Wærstan was consecrated around 909. He died either in 918 or between around 909 and 925.

Notes

Citations

References

External links
 

Bishops of Sherborne (ancient)
10th-century English bishops